Penllyn (head of the lake i.e. Bala Lake or ) was a medieval cantref originally in the Kingdom of Powys but annexed to the Kingdom of Gwynedd.

On the north and west it bordered Gwynedd (the cantrefi of Tegeingl, Rhufoniog, Dunoding and Meirionydd); it bordered the Powys cantrefi of Maelor, Mochnant and Cyfeiliog on the east and south.

After the death of Madog ap Maredudd, the last Prince of the whole of Powys, and his eldest son and heir in 1160, the kingdom was divided between his surviving sons Gruffydd Maelor, Owain Fychan and Owain Brogyntyn, his nephew Owain Cyfeiliog and his half-brother Iorwerth Goch. Penllyn was inherited by Owain Brogyntyn; Edeyrnion had been the home of his mother (who was not married to his father) and he may also have been raised there. 

The military skill and strength of Madog had prevented Gwynedd from asserting hegemony over Powys, but following Madog's death, it was able to force Owain Brogyntyn to become a vassal. Penllyn was thus annexed to Gwynedd.

Following the eventual defeat of Gwynedd by English forces, and the consequent Statute of Rhuddlan, it became part of Merionethshire

References

Cantrefs
History of Powys